Clarence may refer to:

Places

Australia
 Clarence County, New South Wales, a Cadastral division
 Clarence, New South Wales, a place near Lithgow
 Clarence River (New South Wales)
 Clarence Strait (Northern Territory)
 City of Clarence, a local government body and municipality in Tasmania
 Clarence, Western Australia, an early settlement
 Electoral district of Clarence, an electoral district in the New South Wales Legislative Assembly

Canada
 Clarence, Ontario, a hamlet in the city of Clarence-Rockland
 Clarence Township, Ontario
 Clarence, Nova Scotia
 Clarence Islands, Nunavut, Canada

New Zealand
 Clarence, New Zealand, a small town in Marlborough
 Waiau Toa / Clarence River

United States
 Clarence Strait, Alaska
 Clarence, Illinois, an unincorporated community
 Clarence, Iowa, a city
 Clarence Township, Barton County, Kansas
 Clarence, Louisiana, a village
 Clarence Township, Michigan
 Clarence, Missouri, a city
 Clarence, New York, a town
 Clarence (CDP), New York, a census-designated place in the town
 Clarence, Pennsylvania, a census-designated place
 Clarence, Wisconsin, a ghost town

Elsewhere
 Clarence Island (South Shetland Islands), Antarctica
 Clarence Town, Bahamas
 Clarence Island, Chile
 Clarence City or Port Clarence (Fernando Po), Equatorial Guinea, former name of Malabo
 Fort Clarence, Rochester, Kent, England, a former fortification
 Clarence (river), France
 Clarence Strait (Iran)

Arts and entertainment 
 Clarence (play), by Booth Tarkington
 Clarence (1922 film), based on the play, starring Wallace Reid, Agnes Ayres
 Clarence (1937 film), based on the play
 Clarence (1990 film), a spin-off film/sequel to It's a Wonderful Life
 Clarence, star of 1965 film Clarence, the Cross-Eyed Lion which was the basis for the 1966 TV show Daktari
 Clarence (British TV series), a British sitcom starring Ronnie Barker that aired on BBC
 Clarence (American TV series), an American animated series that airs on Cartoon Network
 Clarence (Wonder Showzen character), a puppet from the television show Wonder Showzen
 Clarence (Henry Denker novel), a 2001 novel by Henry Denker
 Clarence (Catharine Sedgwick novel), an 1830 novel by Catharine Sedgwick

Schools 
 Clarence High School (Bellerive, Tasmania), Australia
 Clarence High School (India)
 Clarence High School (Clarence, New York), United States

People 
 Clarence (given name)
 Juma Clarence (born 1989), Trinidadian footballer
 O. B. Clarence (1870–1955), English film and stage actor
 William Henry Clarence (1856–1879), king or hereditary chief of the Miskito people

Other uses
 Duke of Clarence, a title which has been traditionally awarded to members of the English and British royal families
 Clarence (carriage), a type of carriage
 Clarence Correctional Centre, Clarence, New South Wales, Australia
 Clarence railway station, New South Wales, Australia
 Clarence House, a royal home in London
 , three ships of the Royal Navy
 CSS Clarence, a Confederate States Navy commerce raider
 Clarence Railway, a 19th century railway in north-east England
 Clarence Hotel, Dublin, Ireland, a four-star hotel built in 1852
 Clarence Football Club, an Australian football team based in Bellerive, Tasmania

See also
 Clarens (disambiguation)